Roger Bingham is a science educator, author and television host based in La Jolla, California. He is co-founder and director of the Science Network (TSN), a virtual forum dedicated to science and its impact on society. Bingham is also the creator of the Beyond Belief conferences.

Career

Bingham developed the Science and Society Unit at the Los Angeles PBS station, KCET.  There, he wrote, produced and presented the Frontiers of the Mind series, which included "The Addicted Brain", "The Sexual Brain", "The Time of Our Lives", and "Inside Information", programs which have been broadcast in multiple countries and languages. Bingham also co-wrote and hosted the PBS television series The Human Quest (1996). Philip Hefner wrote in The Christian Century that "it provides a benchmark of the minimal scientific knowledge all informed persons should possess (...) Bingham and his PBS series represent the best and brightest of Western scientific intelligence today."  The Human Quest episode The Nature Of Human Nature won a Writers Guild of America Award. 
He co-authored the novel Wild Card (1974) and The Origin of Minds: Evolution, Uniqueness, and the New Science of the Self (Harmony, 2002).

From 1995 to 1996, Bingham was a visiting associate at Caltech in the laboratory of evolutionary neuroscientist, John Allman and a visiting fellow at the Center for Evolutionary Psychology, UC Santa Barbara (co-directed by John Tooby and Leda Cosmides). Bingham and Peggy La Cerra presented an alternative to the model of evolutionary psychology, first in a paper in Proceedings of the National Academy of Sciences of the United States of America, then in The Origin of Minds: Evolution, Uniqueness, and the New Science of the Self. This model was based on the concept of adaptive representational networks (ARN). According to this theory, these networks encode the history of an individual's behavioural successes and failures in relationship to the energy costs of any particular behaviour. Hence, memory becomes an accounting mechanism for computing the energy costs of behaviour. La Cerra and Bingham called this model "Theoretical Evolutionary Neuroscience".

After the publication of The Origin of Minds, Bingham turned his attention to developing a platform for science education and communication. In 2003, with Terry Sejnowski, he initiated the project that became known as the Science Network. The launch of The Science Network was a landmark Symposium and Town Hall meeting, Stem cells: science, ethics and politics at the crossroads, held at the Salk Institute in 2004. Roger Bingham serves as the director of the Science Network.

Bingham is an affiliate of the Computational Neurobiology Laboratory at the Salk Institute for Biological Studies and the Institute for Neural Computationat UC San Diego. Bingham is also a member of the Director's Council, UC San Diego Center for Brain Activity Mapping (C-BAM) and an Executive Committee member of the UCSD Temporal Dynamics of Learning Center (TDLC).

In 2009, Bingham was named a member of the Board of Advisers of Scientific American.

Books
 The Origin of Minds: Evolution, Uniqueness, and the New Science of the Self (2002) Peggy La Cerra and Roger Bingham
 Wild Card (1974) Raymond Hawkey and Roger Bingham

Awards
 Writers Guild of America Award in Documentary, Current Events, The Human Quest: The Nature Of Human Nature, 1996, with Carl Byker
 American Psychological Association Award for Excellence in Television, Inside Information: The Brain and How It Works, 1992, with John Rubin
 National Magazine Award in Public Interest, Technology for Peace: The Politics of Mistrust, Science, 1986

References

External links
 The Science Network
 Edge Question 2008: What Have You Changed Your Mind About? Why?
 Edge Question 2007: What Are You Optimistic About?

British neuroscientists
Writers Guild of America Award winners
Living people
Year of birth missing (living people)
Salk Institute for Biological Studies people
People from Blackpool
Alumni of University College London